Michael Holbrook Penniman Jr. (born 18 August 1983), known professionally as Mika (stylised as MIKA), is a singer-songwriter born in Beirut, Lebanon, and raised in Paris and London.

After recording his first extended play, Dodgy Holiday, Mika was named the number-one predicted breakthrough act of 2007 in an annual BBC poll of music critics, Sound of 2007. Mika released his first full-length studio album, Life in Cartoon Motion, on Island Records in 2007, which has sold more than 8.3 million copies worldwide and helped Mika win a Brit Award—Best British Breakthrough act—and receive a Grammy Award nomination. He topped the UK Singles Chart in January 2007 with "Grace Kelly" and has since gone on to record four more platinum-selling studio albums (most recently My Name is Michael Holbrook released in October 2019), as well as serve as judge/mentor on both the French version of The Voice and the Italian version of X Factor.

Mika also starred for two seasons in his own television variety show in Italy, which won the 2017 Rose d'Or Award for Entertainment, and has hosted his own BBC Radio 2 show The Art of Song. In 2022, he co-hosted the Eurovision Song Contest alongside Italian singer Laura Pausini and Italian television presenter Alessandro Cattelan.

In addition to his musical career, Mika has also worked as a visual artist and designer on various projects, among them sunglasses for the Italian eyewear company Lozza, a clothing line for Belgian retailer JBC, pens for the 100th anniversary of Pilot, and (along with his sister Yasmine) three watches for Swiss company Swatch.

Life and career

1983–2006: Childhood and early career 
On 18 August 1983, Mika was born in Beirut, the third of five children—he has two older sisters, Yasmine and Paloma, a younger sister Zuleika, and a younger brother, Fortuné. His parents are an American-born Lebanese mother (Mary Joan "Joannie", daughter of John Mouakad and Odette Farah) and an Israeli-born American father (Michael Holbrook Penniman, son of William Frederick Penniman III and Dorothy Dyar). Mika's father was a banker born in Jerusalem. His father's father – Mika's paternal grandfather William Frederick Penniman III – was a diplomat. Mika's maternal grandfather John Mouakad was Syrian (from Damascus).

When Mika was a year old, his family was forced to leave war-torn Lebanon and moved to Paris, France.

The family lived happily for a time in Paris. "I was brought up as a Parisian boy, you know," Mika said in an interview. "With the pencil-striped trousers and the hat that I had to wear to school. It was very traditional..."

The first piano piece the young Mika learned to play was "Les Champs-Élysées", by Joe Dassin. At the age of 7, he wrote his first song, a piano instrumental called "Angry", which he describes as "awful".

In 1990 Mika's father went on a business trip to Kuwait and became trapped in the U.S. embassy for seven months when the Gulf War broke out. When the elder Penniman returned home, he had to take a new job, which meant a move to London.

The family moved to London when Mika was 9 years old. There, he attended the Lycée Français Charles de Gaulle, where he experienced severe bullying and had problems with dyslexia. In response to these experiences Mika was home-schooled by his mother and trained in music by Alla Ardakov (Ablaberdyeva), a Russian opera professional. He also studied with the Royal Opera in London and made his stage debut as a chorus member in Strauss's Die Frau Ohne Schatten at the Royal Opera House in London's Covent Garden. He continued as a boy soprano with the Royal Opera and, at 15, he showcased his vocal range in a 1998 production of The Pilgrim's Progress by Vaughan Williams.

Although still young, Mika also worked singing jingles for a variety of companies, most notably Orbit chewing gum and British Airways.

Once he returned to school, Mika attended St Philip's School in Kensington, where he was the head of the Schola Cantorum (the St Philip's Choir). Later he attended Westminster School in London, where he starred in a number of school productions to great acclaim.

After a very brief stint (one day) at the London School of Economics, Mika then managed to gain entrance to the Royal College of Music. By day, Mika studied and practiced his scales, but by night, he visited the rock and electro clubs of Soho and Camden, and wrote pop songs.

Mika left the Royal College of Music to record his first album at Casablanca Records. His first single was a limited 7"/download release called "Relax, Take It Easy" (2006). It was playlisted by UK's BBC Radio 1 and was made Record of the Week by DJ Scott Mills. His Dodgy Holiday EP also became available for download. The song "Billy Brown" was available for free download for a week from the iTunes Store. A song titled 'Overrated', which was recorded in 2004, was "unofficially" released online. His debut radio appearance was on Dermot O'Leary's BBC Radio 2 show in September 2006.

2007–2008: Life in Cartoon Motion 

In 2007, things took off for Mika. His single "Grace Kelly" was released by Universal Music for digital download on 8 January 2007. On 19 January 2007, he appeared on Later... with Jools Holland, and on The Friday Night Project.  That same month, Mika was voted the top of the BBC News website's Sound of 2007 poll. "Grace Kelly" reached number one on the UK Singles Chart on 21 January 2007, and stayed at number one for five weeks.

The single featured on his debut album, Life In Cartoon Motion, which was released on 5 February 2007. The album went straight to number one in the UK and 11 other countries, and brought comparisons with artists such as Freddie Mercury, Scissor Sisters, Elton John, Prince, Robbie Williams and David Bowie. The song "Grace Kelly", in fact, references Mercury in the lyrics: "I try to be like Grace Kelly/But all her looks were too sad/So I tried a little Freddie/I've gone identity mad."  The album went on to sell more than 8.3 million copies worldwide and rack up 2.8 billion streams.

Life in Cartoon Motion has a coming of age theme and deals with Mika's transition from childhood to the present, though he has stated that not all of the songs are autobiographical. His songs often deal with difficult topics. For instance, in "Big Girl (You Are Beautiful)" the theme of larger women suffering from discrimination is explored. Mika has said that the fact that his mother was a big woman, and that he had seen the prejudices against her, helped him to write the song. In another example of dealing with more difficult subject matter, in the song "Billy Brown", Mika writes about a married man who has a homosexual affair.

Mika toured the United States in June 2007, with support from Sara Bareilles and Natalia Lesz. He also made several significant U.S. television appearances to support his new album. He was the musical act for The Tonight Show with Jay Leno on 26 March 2007 and 14 February 2008 and for Jimmy Kimmel Live! on 27 March 2007. He also performed live on So You Think You Can Dance on 26 July 2007.

On 10 October 2007, Mika began his Dodgy Holiday Tour, playing at venues across Europe. On 17 November 2007, Mika started the UK leg of his tour in Glasgow, Scotland, with support from Palladium. The North American leg of his tour began in January 2008 with support from The Midway State and Creature and continued through February with a stop in Los Angeles for the 50th Annual Grammy Awards, where he was nominated for "Best Dance Recording" for his song "Love Today."

On 20 February 2008, Mika opened the 2008 Brit Awards with a live performance of "Love Today," "Grace Kelly," and a duet, "Standing in the Way of Control", with Beth Ditto of Gossip. He was awarded the BRIT Award for Best British Breakthrough Artist later that night.

2009–2010: The Boy Who Knew Too Much 

Prior to the release of his second studio album, Mika released a limited-edition extended play titled Songs for Sorrow on 8 June 2009. The EP includes 4 tracks and a 68-page book featuring lyrics and exclusive illustrated interpretations of each song by some of Mika's favourite artists and designers, among them Jim Woodring, Sophie Blackall, Alber Elbaz, and his own sister, DaWack. The song "Blue Eyes" was used to promote the EP, and was A-listed on the BBC Radio 2 playlist.

Mika's second studio album The Boy Who Knew Too Much was released on 21 September 2009. Mika recorded the majority of the album in Los Angeles with producer and musician Greg Wells, who also produced his debut album Life in Cartoon Motion. The album has been described as Mika dealing with his adolescent teenage years and "in a sense is kind of part two" of his first album.

The album was originally titled We Are Golden after the first single from the album, "We Are Golden". On 20 July 2009 in an on-air interview with DJ Jo Whiley on BBC Radio 1, Mika revealed he was considering renaming the album, because he wanted "something a little more ridiculous." On 6 August 2009 it was confirmed that the album's title would change to The Boy Who Knew Too Much.

The first single from the album, "We Are Golden", made its radio debut in the United Kingdom on 20 July 2009, on BBC Radio 2 and was released for download on 6 September 2009, with the physical release following on 7 September 2009. The single debuted at number 4 on the UK Singles Chart on 13 September 2009. Mika's promotional tour of the single included live performances at the iTunes Festival 2009 at The Roundhouse in Camden, London and on Friday Night with Jonathan Ross in September 2009. It was reported that Mika spent £25,000 on drinks after inviting fans to join him at his local pub via Twitter on 7 September 2009 to celebrate the release of his single.

"Blame It on the Girls" was released as the second single in the United States and Japan. This was alongside "Rain" being the second single in the United Kingdom, which was released on 23 November. "Blame It on the Girls" was released as a single in the United Kingdom on 15 February 2010. His American promotional tour consisted of live performances on Good Morning America in New York City on 25 September 2009 and the Late Show with David Letterman on 14 October 2009.

In November 2009 Mika performed "Rain" and "We Are Golden" live at the Sydney Opera House for the Australian Idol Grand Final. He also performed on Sunrise on the Seven Network in Australia. On 30 November 2009, Mika performed "Let It Snow" in a duet with Japanese pop star Hikaru Utada.

At Blackpool's Opera House in December 2009 Mika had the opportunity to perform in the Royal Variety Performance in front of Queen Elizabeth II and her husband Prince Philip, Duke of Edinburgh. The Royal Variety Performance is an annual gala evening, which, ever since it was established in 1912, is traditionally attended by members of the British Royal Family. Mika sang his single, "Rain," during the evening, which included performances by Lady Gaga, Michael Bublé, Miley Cyrus, Bette Midler, and Whoopi Goldberg, and later had the chance to meet Queen Elizabeth and Prince Philip.

On 21 March 2010 Mika performed a song he had written, "Gave It All Away", with Boyzone on ITV1 for Boyzone: A Tribute To Stephen Gately.

In May 2010 Mika released the single "Kick Ass (We Are Young)", the title track to the 2010 film Kick-Ass. The song played during the film's closing credits.

2010–2014: The Origin of Love, X Factor Italy and Songbook Vol.1

Before the release of his third album, Mika stated in numerous interviews that it would be more simplistic and less layered than the previous one. Mika announced the title of the album, The Origin of Love in a French interview on 17 June. Mika said he would include a number of French tracks on the album, and that the musical style would include elements of Daft Punk and Fleetwood Mac. He described the album as less childlike and more serious.

It was released online on 1 July 2011. The video for the song was released 16 August and featured the French actress Fanny Ardant, along with a number of other well-known French actors and personalities.

Mika collaborated with a number of artists on various tracks of this album, including Nick Littlemore of Empire of the Sun, Paul Steel, frYars, Doriand, Priscilla Renea, Billboard, Hillary Lindsey, Pharrell Williams, Benny Benassi and Klas Åhlund. Greg Wells was again involved in the production of the album. At the time he was working on his own album, MIKA also contributed his vocals to the production of The All-American Rejects' 2012 album Kids in the Street.

Around this time Mika also collaborated with the singer Madonna, and the resulting song, Gang Bang, can be found on her album MDNA.

On 8 June 2012, the video for "Make You Happy" was released on Vimeo. The song served as a buzz single for the album. On 14 June 2012, "Celebrate", which features Pharrell Williams, was announced as the album's lead single. The album was released internationally on 17 September 2012 and in the UK on 8 October 2012.

Included on this album was "Popular Song," which Mika co-wrote and performed on the album with songwriter Priscilla Renea (who now goes by the professional name Muni Long). The song, which borrowed a well-known melody from the musical "Wicked" by Stephen Schwartz, was later remixed and released as a duet in 2013 with Ariana Grande before she reached "superstar" status.

The 2012 Summer Olympics took place in London from 25 July to 12 August 2012, and before the gold medal beach volleyball game on 8 August, Mika performed "Grace Kelly" and "Celebrate" on the sand court. The same day he also did a Q&A with fans and performed a short set for Rock The Games, which live-streamed on the YouTube channel of the London 2012 games.

On 23 April 2013, Mika was revealed to be the new judge on the seventh season of The X Factor Italy. He was the first international mentor on the Italian edition of the show. Mika returned to the panel for the eighth and ninth series of the show before leaving to focus on other projects.

Mika released a compilation album, on 18 November 2013, in Italy titled Songbook Vol. 1, including 20 songs from his three previous albums, plus a few re-worked tracks.

On 17 January 2014, Mika took part in the Italian television show  on La7, and performed a duet with the Nobel Prize in Literature recipient Dario Fo of the song "", written by Fo and played by Enzo Jannacci. That same evening, Mika was presented with a platinum disc for the album Songbook Vol. 1.

Mika joined  (the French version of the television show The Voice) as a judge/mentor in 2014. One of his contestants, Kendji Girac, won the competition that year.

Mika released another French single on 11 June 2014, Boum Boum Boum. The video (which came out 7 July) was filmed entirely in Spain on the set of the famous western The Good, The Bad and the Ugly, and features Mika in a variety of guises—from cowboy to James Bond-like spy.

2015–2018: No Place in Heaven 

In February 2015, Mika performed a series of three concerts with the Montreal Symphony Orchestra, under the direction of conductor Simon Leclerc. The concerts featured a selection of Mika's songs scored for a full orchestra by Mika and Leclerc. The concerts met with glowing reviews, with some calling the presentations "memorable" and "a beautiful collaboration between the artist and the orchestra." Mika and Leclerc followed up the Montreal concerts with a similar performance in October 2015 at the Teatro Sociale in Como, Italy. The concert, performed in conjunction with L'Orchestra Sinfonica and Coro Affinis Consort, was televised and a DVD featuring the recording was issued under the title "Sinfonia Pop."

Mika's next album was preceded by the single Talk About You, which previewed on 25 March 2015, with the official video on YouTube a few days later.

Mika began a tour to support the upcoming album on 3 May 2015 in Brooklyn, New York, and subsequently toured in major cities around the world. On 25 May 2015 the official video for the next single, Good Guys, was released.

Mika's fourth album, No Place in Heaven, was released on 15 June 2015. He described the album as "direct, low-down, open, candid, playful, yet a mature pop album which takes its inspiration from '60s pop music". On 13 November 2015 the album was re-released in the form of a double-disc deluxe edition, containing a number of bonus tracks on Disc 1 as well as a full-length orchestral bonus disc, which includes a performance by Mika with L'Orchestre Symphonique De Montreal.

The following year, Mika began filming for his own television show, called Stasera Casa Mika, in Italy. The variety show featured a number of Italian actors, musicians and other cultural icons, as well as performers from around the world, including Kylie Minogue, Sting, LP and Dita von Teese. In addition to music, the show had comedy sketches and serious looks at life around Italy. The show won the 2017 Rose d'Or as Best Entertainment Series.

Starting 1 January 2016 and periodically through January 2019, Mika hosted a series of episodes (11 in total) of Mika: The Art Of Song on BBC Radio 2. In the programs, he discussed musical influences and focused on a variety of artists, including Joni Mitchell and Carole King.

Mika reunited with conductor Simon Leclerc at the end of 2016 to perform two concerts at the Teatro dell'Opera di Firenze in collaboration with the Maggio Musicale Fiorentino. The concerts were performed 30 and 31 December with the orchestra and choir of Maggio Musicale, under the direction of Leclerc, who had previously conducted Mika's symphonic performances in Montreal and Como.

In February 2017, Mika performed a medley of his own songs at the Sanremo Festival, as well as a tribute to the late George Michael.

Mika released a single, "It's My House," which also served as the theme song for the second series of his show Stasera Casa Mika in October 2017. The following month (November 2017), Mika featured on the album Dalida by Ibrahim Malouf, a tribute album to the late Egyptian-Italian-French singer. Mika performed a cover of the Egyptian song "Salma Ya Salama," which Dalida had sung in both Arabic and French in 1977.

In 2018, Mika featured on Adam to Eve no Ringo, a tribute album to Japanese musician Ringo Sheena, covering Sheena's song "Sid to Hakuchūmu" from her debut album Muzai Moratorium (1999).

Mika collaborated with the French singers Doriand and Philippe Katerine on a single called "Danser Entre Hommes" in late 2018. It was released by Doriand on 30 August 2019. All three men appear in the song's music video.

2019–2020: My Name Is Michael Holbrook 

In May 2019, Mika released the single "Ice Cream" and announced his fifth studio album, My Name Is Michael Holbrook, for release on 4 October 2019. The album, described as "intensely personal" by a number of reviewers, also contains elements of "disco-tinged exuberance" and "joyous pop" with "anthemic choruses and vocal harmonies".

Mika collaborated with singer Jack Savoretti on single "Youth And Love", which was released on 28 June 2019. The original version of the song appeared on Savoretti's March 2019 album Singing To Strangers. The new duet was produced by Cam Blackwood, with Mika's vocals recorded at his home studio in Florence. It received a worldwide exclusive play from Zoe Ball on her BBC Radio 2 Breakfast Show, first airing on 19 June 2019 and was subsequently added to BBC Radio 2's New Music Playlist (A list). (A special edition of Savoretti's album was released on 6 December 2019 including "Youth And Love" with Mika as the 20th track.) Savoretti subsequently appeared on a track on Mika's new album, "Ready to Call This Love."

Mika was a guest at singer Andrea Bocelli’s charity orchestral concert at Teatro Del Silenzio in Lajatico, Italy on 25 July 2019, and duetted with him on the song "Ali Di Libertà". Mika also sang his own "Happy Ending" and "Tiny Love", accompanied by the orchestra, a troupe of dancers, Ida Falk-Winland, and Max Taylor, and was interviewed onstage by the host. The concert was broadcast on Italian television network RAI1 on 14 September 2019.

Several singles and accompanying videos were released in the months leading up to the debut of the My Name Is Michael Holbrook album: "Tiny Love," "Dear Jealousy," "Tomorrow," and "Sanremo." The album was promoted in September 2019 with the seven-date Tiny Love Tiny Tour at small venues in New York, Montreal, San Francisco, Los Angeles and Mexico City. In addition, Mika appeared on the American TV show Late Night with Seth Meyers on 11 September 2019, performing new song "Tiny Love," along with "Big Girl" from his first album.

In October 2019, Mika was honored with the Music Award at the 2019 Virgin Atlantic Attitude Awards hosted in London by the UK's Attitude  magazine. The award acknowledged that "after staring down homophobia at the start of his pop career, Mika is now making unapologetically queer music that also processes his past pain." In a related article in Attitude, Mika noted, "If I didn't have music, I would not have been able to understand or deal with my sexuality in the same way. It's always been at the centre of my writing."

Mika launched a worldwide tour, known as the Revelation Tour, in London on 10 November 2019. The 2019 leg of the tour included dates in Spain, France, Italy, Switzerland and Belgium. It continued in 2020 with stops in Netherlands, Luxembourg, France, and Italy then went on to several dates in New Zealand and Australia.  Due to the COVID-19 pandemic, Mika announced in February 2020 the cancellation of the Asian leg of the tour in Japan, China and South Korea.  Subsequently, the North and South American leg of the tour were cancelled, including a performance at the Coachella Valley Music and Arts Festival.

In between concert stops, Mika made several television appearances, including: a live episode of X Factor Italia (24 October 2019); the finale of France's The Voice Kids (October 2019); and the live finale of Danse Avec les Stars (23 November 2019). Mika also performed on top of the Eiffel Tower in Paris as part of its 130th anniversary celebration in October 2019.

In January 2020, Mika released the album "MIKA Live at Brooklyn Steel," for digital download/streaming only. It is a recording of his 13 September 2019 concert at the venue Brooklyn Steel in New York.

With touring on hold due to the pandemic, Mika returned to Italian television and X Factor Italia as a judge in the summer/fall of 2020.

After the devastating explosion that hit Beirut in August 2020, Mika was moved to honor his Lebanese heritage and organized a streaming concert in aid of the citizens of that city. The resulting concert film, titled "I Love Beirut", featured a number of international performers, including Kylie Minogue, Danna Paola, Louane, Salma Hayek and Rufus Wainwright.  It was viewed in 106 countries around the globe and raised more than €1 million.

The summer of 2020 also saw Mika release a number of collaborations. In August, he released Le Coeur Holiday with the French rapper Soprano, with whom he had worked on The Voice France. The video for this song was an animated short that featured cartoon versions of the singers in a touching tale of friendship. Also in August, Mika duetted with Italian singer Michele Bravi on an updated version of Bella d'estate, originally recorded in 1987 by the singer Mango. Rounding out the summer of international collaborations, on 11 September 2020, Mika appeared along with Mexican singer and actress Danna Paola on her single titled Me, Myself.

Mika sang vocals on one more single around this time, this for the Canadian singer-songwriter Pierre Lapointe. The song, "Six Heures d'Avion Nous Séparent", appears on Lapointe's 2020 album Chansons Hivernales.

Just before Christmas 2020, Mika hosted "Do Re MIKA Sol," a concert to benefit the charity Imagine for Margo, held in the pediatric department of the French Institut Curie. The concert was broadcast live on Facebook. Mika performed a set of Christmas carols for patients and their families, and hospital staff, accompanied by members of the 100 Voices of Gospel. Mika closed out 2020 by performing several times at the Palace of Versailles near Paris. In mid-December he performed an intimate live concert with the Royal Opera of Versailles with a variety of classical and other musicians. An album of the concert, Mika a l'Opéra Royal de Versailles, was later released in early 2021. Mika also performed at the New Year's Eve celebration, La Grande Soirée, filmed at Versailles, which aired on France 2, where he performed an 8-minute opening medley of some of his biggest hits.

2021–2022: Other ventures during the COVID-19 pandemic 

Touring and most live performances continued to be on hold in 2021 due to the COVID-19 pandemic, so Mika turned to a number of other projects.

In March 2021, Mika launched a project that was billed as an open-air exhibition to give colours back to Paris. Collaborating with a number of artists and his sister Yasmine, Mika created a series of posters that were displayed on the Morris columns and other advertising boards around the city.

Mika quarantined in Canada for two weeks in Spring 2021 so that he could then work on the Canadian version of the talent show Star Academie. He served as artistic director for two episodes, during which he coached the young contestants and performed with them, as well. In addition to singing a number of his most popular songs, Mika joined in on covers of David Bowie's Heroes and Leonard Cohen's Hallelujah.

For Pride Month in June, Mika partnered with job-search platform Indeed for an initiative called "Soundtrack of Empathy." The initiative encouraged workers to share their music playlists with colleagues, in an effort to create a more empathetic workplace. Along with the "Soundtrack of Empathy," Mika performed a live-streamed benefit concert, which raised $40,000 for Lady Gaga's Born This Way Foundation. There was also an influencer roundtable featuring artists selected by Mika, who spoke about the shared language of music and how it naturally encourages empathy and sparks vulnerability.

Mika performed at two private concerts hosted by jeweler Chopard during the Cannes Film Festival in July. While attending these events, he was followed by Italian filmmaker Pif, who filmed a special episode on a day in Mika's life, which was broadcast in the fall on Italian television show Il Testimone (The Witness).

Mika continued his work as a judge on X Factor Italia in 2021, alongside co-judges singer Emma Marrone, Italian rapper and producer Hell Raton, and Manuel Agnelli, of the Italian band Afterhours. He also rejoined The Voice in France, for a special "All-Stars" 10th anniversary edition.

September 2021 marked Mika's return to larger performances, as he headlined a private event hosted by American Express for its premium cardholders. The concert was held at Salle Pleyel in Paris for about 2000 attendees.

Reuniting once again with composer and conductor Simon Leclerc, Mika performed orchestral versions of many of his hits during two sold-out concerts in October at the Philharmonie de Paris. The concerts were performed with the National Orchestra de France and the Choeur Stella Maris on 23 and 24 October. The 23 October concert was filmed and subsequently broadcast on TV in both France and Italy. It was later also broadcast on several PBS stations in the United States.

In early December 2021, Mika announced that he would be continuing his partnership with Indeed, which would sponsor a short North American tour in Spring 2022. With stops in New York (Brooklyn), Boston, Montreal and Toronto, the "For the Rite of Spring Tour" was scheduled to span three weeks in April. Additional dates were added to the For the Rite of Spring Tour, including two dates at the Coachella festival in California. Unfortunately, Mika became ill and needed to cancel the Boston date, and reschedule the others, but eventually the tour took place.

After concluding the "For the Rite of Spring Tour," Mika jetted to Turin (Torino), Italy, to serve as co-host for the Eurovision Song Contest 2022 alongside Italian singer Laura Pausini and TV presenter Alessandro Cattelan. The show was broadcast live globally, with audience figures reaching 161 million viewers. Of the experience, Mika said in an Instagram post: "With this performance I asked myself, what’s the fundamental message? This time around it was love. It’s this idea that love is this one thing that can break down barriers, it’s this one thing that makes you feel like a superhero. Love goes over everything else. It opens every door. When you feel love, everything is possible. When you don’t feel love, well, the world is a tougher, harder, darker place. The entire arena, every single person, including all the different artists and delegations, were given the same flag in their hand. Not the flag of a country, but for the first time at Eurovision, the flag of love. A flag with a red heart. All of us waving it the air together, on air, at the grand final of Eurovision."

On 13 May, Mika released the single "Yo Yo". The lyric video for the single was released at the same time. Mika performed "Yo Yo" for the first time as part of the interval act at the grand final of the Eurovision contest on 14 May 2022. The video for Yo Yo was directed by Mika and was released on 14 June.

The summer following Mika's Eurovision stint was one of his busiest ever. He kicked off the season with a performance at Disneyland Paris Pride, an appearance that was postponed from two years earlier due to the pandemic.

Immediately afterward, Mika flew to New York to participate in Take Pride Live!, an hour-long YouTube Pride Month special sponsored by Indeed, and hosted by Terrell Grice. During the program, Mika debuted a new song, Who's Gonna Love Me Now? The ballad is featured in the directorial debut of Emmy, Tony, and Grammy Award winner Billy Porter called "Anything's Possible."

Mika then returned to London after a more than two-year absence for a sold-out concert at the famous Roundhouse in Camden on 3 July 2022.  He followed that with an array of festival shows throughout July, August, and into early September, with stops in France, Switzerland, Belgium, Spain and Sardinia. Due to insurmountable technical and logistical problems, however, a planned "Magic Piano Tour" covering 10 dates in Italy in September and October was indefinitely postponed.

In between the festival shows, Mika found time to record and release a single, "Bolero," with Italian singer BabyK. The single came out 17 June, with the video featuring both singers releasing on 14 July. Mika promoted the single by performing it with BabyK at the TIM Summer Hits show in Italy.

In addition, Mika retained one Italian concert date—at the famed Arena di Verona on 19 September. There, nearly 20,000 fans were entertained for almost two hours, with confetti, balloons, bubbles, fan actions and more in an explosive end-of-summer celebration.

In October, Mika performed in Monte Carlo, at a charity event organised by the Venetian Arts Foundation to benefit the Prince Albert II Foundation, and its coastal resilience and marine protection projects.

2023 and upcoming projects 
On 18 January 2023, Mika released a new single, "Keep It Simple," with French singer-songwriter Vianney.

Later in January, he hosted "Le Gala des Pieces Jaunes," a charity show in support of Paris' Hospital Foundation, which works to better the daily lives of hospitalized children and their families. In addition to acting as presenter, Mika performed a medley of his songs, as well as "Keep It Simple" with Vianney. Also performing at the gala were South Korean girl group Blackpink, Pharrell Williams, Pascal Obispo, Kid Cudi, Gautier Capuçon, Khatia Buniatishvili and Daniel Lozakovich. During the evening, appeals for donations were launched by the artists. The show was broadcast on French television on 28 January.

The soundtrack for Mika's first film score, for the French-language film Princes of the Desert (Zodi et Tehu, Freres du desert) directed by Eric Barbier and starring Alexandra Lamy, Youssef Hajdi, and Nadia Benzakour, was released on 3 February 2023. (The film hit French theaters on 8 February 2023.) To create the score, Mika worked with 160 musicians from around the world, including a celebrated female artist from South Africa and classical Berber musicians from Morocco.

A new UK television program called The Piano, featuring Mika as a judge, was broadcast on the UK's Channel 4 starting 15 February 2023. The series, produced by Love Productions (also responsible for The Great British Bake Off), followed a number of musicians on a journey from playing in public train stations around the UK to the Royal Festival Hall stage. Hosted by Claudia Winkleman, the show also features Chinese concert pianist Lang Lang as judge alongside Mika.

Looking to the future, Mika has already announced a number of new projects. He is currently working on two albums—one in the French language, the other in English. No release dates have been announced as yet.

More than a dozen tour dates for 2023 have also been announced: Mika will play two dates in Japan in May—Osaka on 23 May and Tokyo on 24 May. Continuing on from Japan, MIKA will also perform in South Korea for the Seoul Jazz Festival, which runs from the 26 to 28 May. Mika will also return to the UK festival scene in 2023, and is set to perform on 26 April at the Cheltenham Jazz Festival and on 18 June at the Isle of Wight Festival. A few French festival dates have been announced for June 2023, as well as several Italian festival dates set for July 2023 and an appearance at Brava Madrid in Spain in September.

Personal life
Mika's legal name is Michael Holbrook Penniman, Jr., but he was given the nickname Mica by his mother. As he grew older, he changed the 'c' to a 'k'.

Mika has one younger brother and one younger sister along with two older sisters. His oldest sister Yasmine, who works as an artist under the nom de plume DaWack, painted the cartoon art for his two albums Life in Cartoon Motion and The Boy Who Knew Too Much.

Mika was raised as a Melkite Catholic, and in a 2013 interview he described himself as "still a Roman Catholic". He also acknowledged how the church and its ceremonial influenced his musical training and later work.

In addition to English, Mika speaks French, Spanish and Italian fluently; in an interview on 28 September 2009 with The Chris Moyles Show on BBC Radio 1 he commented that he had taken Mandarin Chinese lessons for nine years but does not speak it very well; he also mentioned that his three sisters speak it fluently. He also speaks a little Arabic, in a Lebanese dialect. Mika holds dual UK and US citizenship.

In August 2010, Mika acquired a golden retriever puppy, which he named Melachi (the Witch). Her nickname is Mel or Moo. Several years later, in the spring of 2015, he got a second golden retriever pup, which he named Amira. Amira is actually Melachi's niece and her nickname is Sharky.

Early in his career, many questions about Mika's sexual orientation arose, but he declined to label himself. In a September 2009 interview in Gay & Night Mika commented on his sexuality: "I've never ever labelled myself. But having said that, I've never limited my life, I've never limited who I sleep with ... Call me whatever you want. Call me bisexual, if you need a term for me ..." In a March 2010 interview with the London Evening Standard, he stated: "I consider myself label-less because I could fall in love with anybody – literally – any type, any body. I'm not picky."

In an August 2012 interview with the magazine Instinct, the singer described himself as gay. In recent years, Mika has been more open about his family life and his personal relationship with film-maker Andreas Dermanis, with whom he has been involved for more than 10 years.

Mika has stated that he practices transcendental meditation and finds it useful.

Since 2013, he has spent a lot of time in Italy, where he has a house and a studio in Tuscany in the province of Florence. Mika also owns a home in Miami, Florida, a 1920s Spanish-style home that he has restored and in which he has built a recording studio.

Side projects and endorsements 
Mika has often written songs for other musicians, saying, "I write songs for other people under different names most of the time. I have a little family of three names. One of them has been discovered – it's Alice." One such song, "Ci Parliamo da Grandi", was recorded and made famous by Italian singer Eros Ramazotti.

Mika served as a model for fashion designer Paul Smith's spring/summer 2007 global ad campaign.

In 2012 and 2013, Mika served as the face of Lozza sunglasses in advertising campaigns. He also designed a line of sunglasses for the Italian eyewear company.

Also in 2013, Mika designed a line of clothing for Belgian retailer JBC. The collection included items for men, women and children. At the time of the line's release, Mika told journalists, "For the menswear collection I took inspiration from my own wardrobe. I like easy to wear, stylish clothing that you can put on quickly in the morning and still look stylish." For the children's and women's collections, Mika took inspiration from his youth. “I grew up in a house with three sisters and was always made to tag along on all kinds of shopping trips."

Mika and his sister Yasmine designed two watches for Swiss watchmaker Swatch in 2013, in honor of the company's 30th anniversary. The watches were unveiled in November 2013 at the Venice Biennale. The regular edition "Kukulakuku" has a large watch face dominated by blue and comes in a plastic box, while the strictly limited edition "Kukulakuki" has a smaller face dominated by white and comes in a special tin and box.

Mika lent his song "Live Your Life" to the advertising campaign for Spanish beer San Miguel in 2013, appearing in a commercial that doubled as the song's music video. He also appeared in print ads for the brand.

Belgian telecommunications company Mobistar featured Mika in an online film in 2014, with him singing "Grace Kelly" in front of a crowd at the Antwerp train station to promote the company's "Have a Nice Day" campaign. The film was accompanied by an in-store poster campaign. Mika did a signing session at the Mobistar concept store in Liege, then performed a concert in Brussels for invitation-only/Mobistar competition winners on 18 September 2014.

Mika is the narrator and voice of the main character, Mustafa, in the 84-minute French-language version of the animated film The Prophet. The film was produced by Salma Hayek and is based on a book of poetry by world-renowned Lebanese-American writer, poet and visual artist Kahlil Gibran. At the Cannes film festival in 2014, Mika joined Hayek, her husband and her daughter (who also voices a character in the French version), and actress Julie Gayet on the red carpet to celebrate the film's launch. The French version was released in theaters in France on 2 December 2015 and on DVD/Blu-ray in August 2016. To promote its theatrical release Hayek and Mika appeared together on the French TV shows C à Vous on 1 December 2015 and Le Grand 8 on 2 December 2015.

In Trieste, Italy, on 11–12 July 2014, Mika and his sister Yasmine were two of the judges for the International Talent Support Contest (ITS). They judged 10 pieces in the Swatch-sponsored "ITS ARTWORK" category.

Mika covered the song "Je Chante" by Charles Trenet for TGV's advertising campaign in 2015, and appeared in a related video/commercial. The song is on Mika's November 2015 reissue of No Place In Heaven as the 15th track on the French edition of the album.

In May 2016, Mika and Yasmine unveiled another Swatch watch that they had designed. This Swatch was named Mumu-Cucurrucucu. It has an engraved golden dial with a bright colored geometric design dominated by white and green, and comes in a box also designed by Mika and his sister.

Mika was part of an advertising campaign for the Peugeot 108 automobile in March 2017. At the time, he said, "The new campaign is a fun collision of my world and that of the 108."

Also, at the end of 2017, Mika began a collaboration with Pilot pens. He and his sister Yasmine designed a collection of 24 different pens to help celebrate Pilot's 100th anniversary. As part of the promotion for this collaboration, a newly remixed (by Ryan Riback) version of Mika's song "Celebrate" was released and used in advertisements.

Mika became an Opel brand ambassador in Italy in autumn 2020 and starred in a commercial for the Corsa-e in September 2020, one for the 100% electric Mokka-e in October 2020, and one for Opel Grandland X Plug-in-Hybrid in February 2021. All three commercials prominently featured his song "Domani".

At the International Talent Support (ITS) Contest in October 2020, Mika and his sister Yasmine were on the international jury, helping to decide the winners of the ITS Responsible Fashion Award and the ITS Responsible Accessories Award. Due to the global COVID-19 pandemic, the jury met virtually and no in-person event was held. The results were live-streamed on 23 October 2020, but Mika and Yasmine only appeared as photos while the host introduced the jurors.

In October 2021, Mika announced that he had invested in a French company called Divie, which produces products made with CBD oil. Mika noted that he had used CBD for some time, especially on tour, and believed in its benefits.

Philanthropy 
Mika participated in "Children in Need Rocks," a charity event organized by singer Gary Barlow and held at London's Royal Albert Hall ahead of the annual "Children in Need" appeal. Among those also performing that evening were Sir Paul McCartney, Dame Shirley Bassey, Leona Lewis, members of Take That, Paolo Nutini, Lily Allen, and Muse. The concert was held 12 November 2009 and was broadcast on BBC1 and Radio 2.

Also in November 2009, Mika performed an acoustic concert at London's Union Chapel as part of the "Little Noise Sessions" organised by the charity Mencap. Singing alongside Mika during this concert were the a cappella group The King's Singers.

Mika and his sister Yasmine worked on a special project for Coca-Cola in early 2010, designing an artistic, limited edition aluminum Coke bottle that also benefited charity. The "Happiness Bottle" was, according to Mika, inspired by Japanese psychedelic posters from the 1960s. It has a red background and features a bright yellow sun along with some tribal figures and other symbols. There was also a collector's version of the bottle that was packaged in a decorated box that opened to show a 3D scene. Mika talked about the project at the time, saying, "When I said yes to Coca-Cola for this project, one of the conditions that I had, and I was very clear about this since the beginning, was that I wanted to have a charity side attached to it. So I said: OK, I'll draw this bottle, but all the money that they would pay me will go to a charity. So I chose Hôpitaux de France and Hôpitaux de Paris, and particulary their 'Maison des adolescents' project. This charity side for me was the most important of all."

Mika teamed up with some of the biggest names in pop to record a cover version of REM's 'Everybody Hurts' in support of charities helping relief efforts after an earthquake hit the island of Haiti in early 2010. Mika played piano and shared vocals with the likes of Mariah Carey, Kylie Minogue, Jon Bon Jovi, Rod Stewart, Michael Buble and Susan Boyle. The track was organised by Simon Cowell and The Sun newspaper.  Mika also donated various pieces of memorabilia for auction to raise additional funds for Haiti, including a milk carton prop used in his video for the single "Rain", as well as the t-shirt he wore in the Haiti video, plus an autographed CD single of "Everybody Hurts." At the time, Mika said on his website, "I was hugely honoured to be asked by The Sun to be part of this single. I am really pleased with how it turned out, it sounds fantastic, and I hope the public will support it to raise money for this worthy cause." He also donated a signed poster to the charity Oxfam UK to help raise funds for its work in Haiti.

In 2012, Mika offered tickets and flights to one of his shows anywhere in the world to raise money for the UK charity London's Air Ambulance, in conjunction with members of the Mika Fan Club (MFC). The resulting raffle raised more than £6,600.

In both 2012 and 2013, Mika contributed some of his doodles to the UK charity Epilepsy Action's National Doodle Day auction. His doodles raised more than £1000 for the organization.

Mika participated in the televised January 2013 Les Enfoirés, a yearly charity show, at Bercy Arena in France. In that show he was featured on Psy's "Gangnam Style" (with Lorie, Zazie and Amel Bent), Niagra's "J'ai Vu" (with Michael Jones, Lorie and Zaz), and Les Enfoirés’ "La Chanson des Restos" (with 38 of the other Enfoirés). The songs on which Mika accompanied (in the choir or on stage dancing) were Laurent Voulzy's "Jeanne", Johnny Hallyday's "Fils de Personne", Michel Telo's "Ai Se Eu Te Pego", Shy'm’s "Et Alors", children's song "A la Pêche aux Moules", Patrick Bruel's "Place des Grands Hommes", Téléphone's "New-York Avec Toi", Joe Dassin's "L'Amérique", and Les Enfoirés's "Attention au Départ". Several of these songs appear on the Les Enfoirés 2-disc CD La Boîte À Musique Des Enfoirés released September 2013 and the single disc DVD released in March 2013. During a non-televised scene change Mika and Shy'm sang "Elle Me Dit" together; and at the end he picked her up and carried her off.

For Christmas 2014, Mika contributed a design to a collection of Christmas cards sold in Italy, the proceeds of which went to the European Association for Research in Surgical Oncology. The original design was also auctioned off for charity, raising €1,075.

Over the years, Mika has supported the French charitable organisation Imagine for Margo/Children without Cancer. In 2014 and 2015, Mika and the late photographer Peter Lindbergh worked together on an advertising campaign for the charity. Mika's image continues to be used in ads for the organisation, and in December 2020 Mika performed a concert to benefit the charity at the pediatric department of the French Institut Curie that was broadcast live on Facebook.

In December 2015, Mika visited Lebanon with UNHCR, the UN Refugee Agency, and spent time with refugees who had been forced to flee their homes during the ongoing conflict in Syria. Since then, he has made several video messages in support of this organisation and in November 2017 was a special guest at a UNHCR charity event held in Milan.

Mika hosted the charity show Le Gala des Pieces Jaunes at the Zénith in Paris in support of the Hospital Foundation in late January 2023. In addition to presenting, Mika performed a medley of his songs, along with a new single, ‘Keep It Simple’ ft. Vianney. Also performing at the gala were South Korean girl group Blackpink, Pharrell Williams, Pascal Obispo, Kid Cudi, Gautier Capuçon, Khatia Buniatishvili and Daniel Lozakovich. During the evening, appeals for donations were launched by the artists: the contributions of each one making it possible to change the daily life of hospitalized children and their families. The show was later broadcast on French TV channel France2.

Discography

 Life in Cartoon Motion (2007)
 The Boy Who Knew Too Much (2009)
 The Origin of Love (2012)
 No Place in Heaven (2015)
 My Name Is Michael Holbrook (2019)
 Zodi et Tehu, Freres du desert (soundtrack) (2023)

Filmography
 Live in Cartoon Motion (2007)
 Live Parc des Princes Paris (2008)
 Cadences obstinées (2014), as Lucio
 The Prophet (2015), voice of Mustafa for the French version
Mika Love Paris - Live a Bercy (2016)
Sinfonia Pop (2016)

Tours
Dodgy Holiday Tour (2007–2008)
Songs for Sorrow Acoustic Tour (2009)
1955 Tour (2009)
Imaginarium Tour (2010)
The Origin of Love Tour (2012)
An Intimate Evening (2013)
No Place in Heaven Tour (2015–2016)
Tiny Love Tiny Tour (2019)
Revelation Tour (2019–2020)
For the Rite of Spring (2022)

Awards and nominations
In March 2010, Mika became the youngest person ever to be honored with the French Order of Arts and Letters (Chevalier [Knight]) for services to music.

In recognition of his efforts for aiding Lebanon via the "I Love Beirut" concert, Mika received the Order of Merit (Lebanon) in January 2021.

Mika has also been nominated for and won many other awards and honors in the music industry:
{| class="wikitable sortable plainrowheaders" 
|-
! scope="col" | Award
! scope="col" | Year
! scope="col" | Category
! scope="col" | Nominee(s)
! scope="col" | Result
! scope="col" class="unsortable"| 
|-
! scope="row"| Amadeus Austrian Music Awards
| 2008
| Best International Single
| "Grace Kelly"
| 
| 
|-
! scope="row"| Attitude Awards
| 2019
| The Music Award
| Mika
| 
|
|-
! scope="row"|BBC Sound of...
| 2007
| Sound of 2007
| Mika
| 
| 
|-
! scope="row"|BT Digital Music Awards
| 2007
| Best Pop Artist 
| Mika
| 
|
|-
! scope="row" rowspan=5|Brit Awards
| rowspan=4|2008
| British Single of the Year
| "Grace Kelly"
| 
|rowspan=4|
|-
| British Album of the Year
| Life in Cartoon Motion
| 
|-
| British Breakthrough Act
| rowspan=3|Mika
| 
|-
| rowspan=2|British Male Solo Artist
| 
|-
| 2010
| 
|
|-
! scope="row" rowspan=2|Capital FM's Awards
| rowspan=2|2008
| Favorite UK Male Artist 
| Mika
| 
|rowspan=2|
|-
| Favorite UK Album
| Life in Cartoon Motion
| 
|-
! scope="row" rowspan=2|Coca-Cola Onstage Awards
| 2017
| Best International Pop Show
| rowspan=2|Mika
| 
| 
|-
| 2020
| Best International Artist
| 
| 
|-
! scope="row"| Danish Music Awards
| 2008
| Foreign Newcomer of the Year
| Mika
| 
|
|-
! scope="row" rowspan=2|ECHO Awards
| rowspan=2|2008
| Best International Newcomer
| rowspan=2|Mika
| 
|rowspan=2|
|-
| Best International Male
| 
|-
! scope="row"|Flaiano Prizes
| 2018
| Best Television Programm
| Stasera casa Mika
| 
|
|-
!scope="row" rowspan=2|Denmark Gaffa Awards
| rowspan=2|2020
| Best Foreign Solo Act 
| Mika
| 
|rowspan=2|
|-
| Best Foreign Album 
| rowspan=2|My Name Is Michael Holbrook
| 
|-
! scope="row|GLAAD Media Award
|2020
|Outstanding Music Artist
| 
|
|-
! scope="row"|Gay Music Chart Awards
| 2015
| Best British Music Video
| "Good Guys" 
| 
|
|-
! scope="row"|Grammy Awards
| 2008
| Best Dance Recording
| "Love Today"
| 
|
|-
! scope="row"|IFPI Hong Kong Top Sales Music Awards
| 2007
| Top 10 Best Selling Foreign Albums
| Life in Cartoon Motion
| 
|
|-
! scope="row" rowspan=2|Ivor Novello Awards
| rowspan=2|2008
| Songwriter of the Year
| Mika
| 
|rowspan=2|
|-
| Best Selling British Song
| "Grace Kelly"
| 
|-
! scope="row" rowspan=2|Los Premios 40 Principales
| rowspan=2|2007
| Best International Song
| "Grace Kelly" 
| 
| rowspan=2|
|-
| Best International Artist
| rowspan=1|Mika
| 
|-
! scope="row"| MTV Asia Awards
| 2008
| Favorite Breakthrough Artist
| Mika
| 
|
|-
! scope="row"| MTV Australia Awards
| 2008
| Video of the Year
| "Happy Ending"
| 
|
|-
! scope="row" rowspan=3|MTV Europe Music Awards
| rowspan=2|2007
| Most Addictive Track
| "Grace Kelly"
| 
|rowspan=2|
|-
| Best Solo Act
| rowspan=2|Mika
| 
|-
| 2009
| Best Male
| 
|
|-
! scope="row" rowspan=4 | MTV Italian Music Awards
| 2008
| rowspan=2|Man of the Year
| rowspan=4|Mika
| 
| 
|-
| 2010
| 
|
|-
| 2011
| Too Much Award
| 
|
|-
| 2015
| #MTVAwardsStar
| 
|
|-
! scope="row" | MTV Video Music Awards Japan
| 2008
| Best New Artist in a Video
| "Grace Kelly"
| 
|
|-
! scope="row" rowspan=2|NME Awards
| rowspan=2|2008
| Worst Dressed
| Mika
| 
|rowspan=2|
|-
| Worst Album
| Life in Cartoon Motion
| 
|-
! scope="row" rowspan=8|NRJ Music Awards
| rowspan=4|2008
| International Song of the Year
| rowspan=2|"Relax, Take It Easy"
| 
| rowspan=4|
|-
| Music Video of the Year
| 
|-
| International Album of the Year
| Life in Cartoon Motion
| 
|-
| International Revelation of the Year
| rowspan=3|Mika
| 
|-
| 2010
| rowspan=2|International Male Artist of the Year
| 
|
|-
| rowspan=3|2012
| 
|rowspan=3|
|-
| International Song of the Year
| rowspan=2|"Elle me dit"
| 
|-
| Music Video of the Year
| 
|-
! scope="row"|Nickelodeon Australian Kids' Choice Awards
| 2007
| Fave International Singer
| Mika
| 
|
|-
! scope="row" rowspan=3|Nickelodeon UK Kids' Choice Awards
| rowspan=2|2007
| Best Music Video
| "Grace Kelly"
| 
|rowspan=2|
|-
| Best Male Singer
| rowspan=2|Mika
| 
|-
| 2008
| Best Singer 
| 
|
|-
! scope="row" rowspan=2|Q Awards
| 2007
| Best Breakthrough Act 
| Mika
| 
|
|-
| 2009
| Best Video
| "We Are Golden"
| 
| 
|-
! scope="row" |Radio Disney Music Awards
| 2014
| Best Musical Collaboration
| "Popular Song" 
| 
|
|-
! scope="row" |Rose d'Or
| 2017
| Best Entertainment Series
| Stasera casa Mika
| 
|
|-
! scope="row" |Silver Palm - Order of Merit
| 2021
| Lebanese National Award
| Mika
| 
|
|-
! scope="row" |Swiss Music Awards
| 2008
| Best International Newcomer
| Mika
| 
|
|-
! scope="row" rowspan=3|TMF Awards
| rowspan=3|2008
| Best International Pop
| rowspan=3|Mika
| 
|-
| Best International Male
| 
|-
| Best International New
| 
|-
! scope="row" |Teen Choice Awards
| 2007
| Choice Male Breakout Artist
| Mika
| 
|
|-
! scope="row" |The Record of the Year
| 2007
| Record of the Year
| "Grace Kelly"
| 
| 
|-
! scope="row" |UK Festival Awards
| 2007
| Best Festival Pop Act
| Mika
| 
|
|-
! scope="row" |UK Music Video Awards
| 2009
| Best Art Direction in a Video
| "We Are Golden"
| 
|
|-
! scope="row"| Victoires de la Musique
| 2012
| Original Song of the Year 
| "Elle me dit"
| 
|
|-
! scope="row" rowspan=3|Virgin Media Music Awards
| rowspan=3|2007
| Best UK Act 
| rowspan=2|Mika
| 
|rowspan=3|
|-
| Most Fanciable Male
| 
|-
| Best Track 
| "Grace Kelly"
| 
|-
! scope="row"| Vodafone Live Music Awards
| 2007
| Best Live Male
| Mika
| 
|
|-
! scope="row" rowspan=12|World Music Awards
| rowspan=3|2007
| World's Best Selling New Artist
| rowspan=6|Mika
| 
| rowspan=3|
|-
| World's Best Selling Pop/Rock Male Artist
| 
|-
| World's Best Selling British Artist
| 
|-
| rowspan="9"|2014
| World's Best Live Act
| 
| rowspan=9|
|-
| World's Best Male Act
| 
|-
| World's Best Entertainer
| 
|-
| World's Best Song
| rowspan="2"|"Popular Song" 
| 
|-
| rowspan=2|World's Best Video
| 
|-
| rowspan="2"|"Underwater"
| 
|-
| World's Best Song
| 
|-
| rowspan=2|World's Best Album
| The Origin of Love
| 
|-
| Songbook Vol. 1
| 
|-
!scope="row" rowspan=5|Žebřík Music Awards
| rowspan=2|2007
| rowspan=3|Himself
| Best International Discovery
| 
| rowspan=4|
|-
| rowspan=2|Best International Male
| 
|-
| rowspan=2|2009
| 
|-
| "Rain"
| Best International Song
| 
|-
| 2014
| "Boum Boum Boum"
| Best International Video
| 
|

References

External links

 
 

 
1983 births
21st-century English singers
Alumni of the Royal College of Music
Brit Award winners
Chevaliers of the Ordre des Arts et des Lettres
English people of American descent
English people of Lebanese descent
English people of Syrian descent
English male songwriters
English gay musicians
Gay singers
Gay songwriters
Ivor Novello Award winners
Naturalised citizens of the United Kingdom
Lebanese emigrants to the United Kingdom
Lebanese people of American descent
Lebanese people of Syrian descent
English Roman Catholics
Lebanese Roman Catholics
LGBT Roman Catholics
English LGBT singers
English LGBT songwriters
Living people
People educated at Lycée Français Charles de Gaulle
People educated at Westminster School, London
Musicians with dyslexia
Singers from London
Wonky pop musicians
World Music Awards winners
Lebanese LGBT people
Universal Records artists
20th-century LGBT people
21st-century LGBT people